Luzan, Lužan or Luzán may refer to:
Luzan, Alberta, Canada
Luzan, Iran, in Ilam Province, Iran
 Lužan, a village in Croatia
Lužan Biškupečki, Croatia
Luzan (surname)

See also
Lužani (disambiguation)
Lužany (disambiguation)
Luzon, main island of the Philippines